Ice Bears may refer to:
 Polar bear
Knoxville Ice Bears, an American professional ice hockey team in Tennessee
Missouri State Ice Bears, an American college ice hockey team

See also
Ice Bear, a fictional polar bear from We Bare Bears